The 2005 Humboldt State Lumberjacks football team represented Humboldt State University during the 2005 NCAA Division II football season. Humboldt State competed in the Great Northwest Athletic Conference (GNAC).

The 2005 Lumberjacks were led by sixth-year head coach Doug Adkins. They played home games at the Redwood Bowl in Arcata, California. Humboldt State finished the season with a record of five wins and six losses (5–6, 1–5 GNAC). The Lumberjacks outscored their opponents 251–212 for the 2005 season.

Schedule

Notes

References

Humboldt State
Humboldt State Lumberjacks football seasons
Humboldt State Lumberjacks football